This is a list of Spanish television related events from 2015.

Events 
 25 January – 25 anniversary of the first private TV Channel in Spain, Antena 3.
 25 February: José Creuheras Margenat is appointed Chairman of Atresmedia Corporación.
 3 March – 25 anniversary of Telecinco.
 31 March – Change in the system of Digital terrestrial television broadcasting due to the so-called Digital dividend after digital television transition.
 8 July – Digital platform Movistar+ is launched
 15 July – TV Channel Mega starts broadcasting.
 20 October – Netflix is launched in Spain.
 22 December – TV Channel Atreseries is launched.

Debuts

Television shows

Ending this year

Changes of network affiliation

Deaths 
 13 January – José Luis Moro, cartoonist, 88.
 29 January – Amparo Baró, actress, 77.
 31 January – José Manuel Lara Bosch, CEO of Atresmedia, 68.
 11 February – Ricardo Palacios, actor, 74.
 7 March – Santi Trancho, cameraman, 31.
 17 March – Juan Claudio Cifuentes «Cifu», host, 73.
 21 March – Moncho Alpuente, journalist, 65.
 25 March – Pedro Reyes, comedian, 53.
 29 March – Matilde Conesa, voice actress, 86.
 4 April – María Pineda, model, 54.
 4 May – Jesús Hermida, journalist, 77.
 7 May
 Aitor Mazo, actor, 53.
 Luis Calvo Teixeira, director and writer, 79.
 23 June – Marujita Díaz, actress, singer and TV pundit, 83.
 23 July – José Sazatornil, actor, 90.
 25 July – Juan Roldán, journalist, 73.
20 August – Lina Morgan, actress, 78.
 5 October – Ana Diosdado, actress and writer, 77.
25 November – María del Puy, actress, 74.

See also 
2015 in Spain

References